Hammatoderus thoracicus is a species of beetle in the family Cerambycidae. It was described by White in 1858. It is known from Mexico, Costa Rica, Guatemala, Panama, Honduras, Colombia, Nicaragua, Peru, El Salvador, and Venezuela.

References

Hammatoderus
Beetles described in 1858